is a professional Japanese baseball player. He was born in Izumiōtsu, Osaka, and plays outfielder for the Yokohama DeNA BayStars.

Aoyagi signed with the Canberra Cavalry of the Australian Baseball League for the 2018/19 season.

References

External links 

1997 births
Living people
Nippon Professional Baseball outfielders
Yokohama DeNA BayStars players
Canberra Cavalry players
People from Izumiōtsu, Osaka
Baseball people from Osaka Prefecture
Japanese expatriate baseball players in Australia